Munida albiapicula is a species of squat lobster in the family Munididae. The specific epithet is derived from the combination of the Latin albus, meaning "white", and apiculus, meaning "tip", referring to the white tips of the supraocular spines.

References

Squat lobsters
Crustaceans described in 1987